Ardeutica is a genus of moths belonging to the family Tortricidae.

Species
Ardeutica crypsilitha  Meyrick, 1932
Ardeutica dryocremna  Meyrick, 1932
Ardeutica emphantica  Razowski & Becker, 1981
Ardeutica eupeplana  Walsingham, 1914
Ardeutica melidora  Razowski, 1984
Ardeutica mezion  Razowski, 1984
Ardeutica parmata  Razowski, 1984
Ardeutica patillae Razowski & Becker, 2011
Ardeutica semipicta  Meyrick, 1913
Ardeutica sphenobathra  Meyrick, 1917
Ardeutica spumosa  Meyrick, 1913
Ardeutica tonsilis  Razowski, 1984

References

 , 2005: World Catalogue of Insects volume 5 Tortricidae.
 , 1913, Transactions of the Entomological Society of London 1913: 172.
 , 2011: Systematic and faunistic data on Neotropical Tortricidae: Phricanthini, Tortricini, Atteriini, Polyorthini, Chlidanotini (Lepidoptera: Tortricidae). Shilap Revista de Lepidopterologia 39 (154): 161-181.

External links
tortricidae.com

Polyorthini
Taxa named by Edward Meyrick
Tortricidae genera